Leadspace is a software as a service (SaaS) Data Science Company that provides a B2B Customer Data Platform. The company's products unifies multiple data sources, 1st party and 3rd party sources from social media, contact databases and customer relationship management systems and Marketing Automation platforms.

History
Leadspace was founded in 2007 (then named Data Essence) by Amnon Mishor and Yaron Karasik, former intelligence officers and experts in semantic analysis and web mining technologies. The company raised funding from Battery Ventures, Jerusalem Venture Partners,   Arrowroot Capital and Vertex Venture Capital.

Leadspace launched its first product, a sales prospecting application, in 2012. In March 2013, Leadspace added the capability of generating targeted lists based on match to an ideal buyer profile, and an online view of a company's ideal buyer profiles.

The company became a Salesforce.com ISV partner and a member in Marketo Launchpoint. In July 2015, Leadspace raised $18 million in funding led by Battery Ventures.

In April 2018, Leadspace announced plans to merge with Radius Technologies. The merger dissolved in August 2018.

In October 2020, JVD Partners sued Leadspace's CEO, Doug Bewsher, claiming he secretly tried to sell the company. The Plaintiffs alleged that Doug Bewsher presented his board with inflated figures for years, he forged data, and he spent money from company's coffers. The suit was subsequently dropped.

References 

Companies based in Menlo Park, California
Software companies based in California
Hod HaSharon
Software companies of the United States
2007 establishments in California
Software companies established in 2007